Islay Creek is a stream in San Luis Obispo County, California.

References

Rivers of San Luis Obispo County, California